Forbidden Relations is a 1983 Hungarian drama film directed by Zsolt Kézdi-Kovács. It was entered into the 1983 Cannes Film Festival.

Cast
 Lili Monori - Juli
 Miklós Székely B. - György
 Mari Törőcsik - Juli anyja
 György Bánffy - Körzeti orvos
 József Horváth - Juli apja
 Tibor Molnár - Pista bácsi
 László Horváth - Lőrinc, rendőr
 Ferenc Paláncz - Kálmán
 József Tóth - Zoli
 Mária Bajcsay - Bírónő
 Klára Leviczki
 Judit Balog - Erzsi
 Ferenc Némethy - Elnök
 László Horesnyi
 Júlia Nyakó - Monika (as Nyakó Juli)

References

External links

1983 films
1980s Hungarian-language films
1983 drama films
Films directed by Zsolt Kézdi-Kovács
Incest in film
Hungarian drama films